Semen cassiae is the apothecary's name for the seeds of two species of plant used in Traditional Chinese Medicine and may refer to:

Senna obtusifolia
Senna tora